The 29th Hundred Flowers Awards was a ceremony held on October 16, 2008 in Dalian, Jilin province. The nominees were announced on August 14.

Awards and nominations

Best Film

Best Director

Best Actor

Best Actress

Best Supporting Actor

Best Supporting Actress

References

External links
 The 29th Hundred Flowers Awards Winners

2008